The avifauna of Ireland included a total of 522 species as of the end of 2019 according to the Irish Rare Birds Committee (IRBC). Of them, 183 are rare, and 14 of the rarities have not been seen in Ireland since 1950. Three species were either introduced to Ireland or came to Ireland from another introduced population.

Ireland has a relatively low diversity of breeding birds due to its isolation. Several species such as the tawny owl, Eurasian nuthatch and willow tit which breed in Great Britain have not been recorded. However, there are large colonies of seabirds including important populations of European storm-petrels, northern gannets, and roseate terns. Other notable breeding birds include corn crakes and red-billed choughs. There are no endemic species but there are endemic subspecies of white-throated dipper, coal tit, and Eurasian jay.

Large numbers of wildfowl and waders winter in Ireland, attracted by its mild climate. About half the world population of the Greenland race of greater white-fronted geese spend the winter there. During autumn, many migrating seabirds can be seen off the coasts including several species of skuas, shearwaters, and petrels. Ireland's westerly position means that North American birds are regularly recorded in autumn.

This list's taxonomic treatment (designation and sequence of orders, families and species) and nomenclature (English and scientific names) are those of the International Ornithological Congress (IOC) as of July 2021. Many of the Irish names are taken from the National Terminology Database for Irish.

The following A, B, and C tags are used by the IRBC to define the status of species. "R" is used here for rare species. The list does not include species placed in "Category D" by the IBRC. These are species where there is doubt as to whether they have occurred in a wild state (Category D1), they have arrived by human assistance such as on board a ship (D2), they have only been recorded dead on the tideline (D3), or they are feral species whose populations may not be self-sustaining (D4). Some species have records of individuals in more than one category; the "highest" category is listed here in those cases.

A - "Species that have been recorded in an apparently natural state in Ireland at least once since 1st January 1950."
B - "Species that have been recorded in an apparently natural state in Ireland at least once up to 31st December 1949, but have not been recorded subsequently." i.e. old vagrant records and/or extirpated species.
C - "Species that, although originally introduced by man, have established feral breeding populations in Ireland which apparently maintain themselves without necessary recourse to further introduction [and species] that have occurred, but are considered to have originated from established naturalised populations outside Ireland."
R  - Species on IRBC Appendix 1, those "requiring substantiating details", i.e. rarities.

Ducks, geese, swans

Order: AnseriformesFamily: Anatidae

Anatidae includes the ducks and most duck-like waterfowl, such as geese and swans. These birds are adapted to an aquatic existence with webbed feet, flattened bills, and feathers that are excellent at shedding water due to an oily coating.

Pheasants and allies

Order: GalliformesFamily: Phasianidae

The Phasianidae are a family of terrestrial birds which consists of quails, partridges, snowcocks, francolins, spurfowls, tragopans, monals, pheasants, peafowls, and jungle fowls. In general, they are plump (although they vary in size) and have broad, relatively short wings.

Nightjars
Order: CaprimulgiformesFamily: Caprimulgidae

Nightjars are medium-sized nocturnal birds that usually nest on the ground. They have long wings, short legs, and very short bills. Most have small feet, of little use for walking, and long pointed wings. Their soft plumage is camouflaged to resemble bark or leaves.

Swifts

Order: ApodiformesFamily: Apodidae

Swifts are small birds which spend the majority of their lives flying. These birds have very short legs and never settle voluntarily on the ground, perching instead only on vertical surfaces. Many swifts have long swept-back wings which resemble a crescent or boomerang.

Bustards
Order: OtidiformesFamily: Otididae

Bustards are large terrestrial birds mainly associated with dry open country and steppes in the Old World. They are omnivorous and nest on the ground. They walk steadily on strong legs and big toes, pecking for food as they go. They have long broad wings with "fingered" wingtips and striking patterns in flight. Many have interesting mating displays.

Cuckoos

Order: CuculiformesFamily: Cuculidae

The family Cuculidae includes cuckoos, roadrunners, and anis. These birds are of variable size with slender bodies, long tails, and strong legs. The Old World cuckoos are brood parasites.

Sandgrouse
Order: PterocliformesFamily: Pteroclidae

Sandgrouse have small, pigeon-like heads and necks, but sturdy compact bodies. They have long pointed wings and sometimes tails and a fast direct flight. Flocks fly to watering holes at dawn and dusk. Their legs are feathered down to the toes.

Pigeons and doves

Order: ColumbiformesFamily: Columbidae

Pigeons and doves are stout-bodied birds with short necks and short slender bills with a fleshy cere.

Rails, crakes and coots

Order: GruiformesFamily: Rallidae

Rallidae is a large family of small to medium-sized birds which includes the rails, crakes, coots, and gallinules. Typically they inhabit dense vegetation in damp environments near lakes, swamps, or rivers. In general they are shy and secretive birds, making them difficult to observe. Most species have strong legs and long toes which are well adapted to soft uneven surfaces. They tend to have short, rounded wings and to be weak fliers.

Cranes
Order: GruiformesFamily: Gruidae

Cranes are large, long-legged, and long-necked birds. Unlike the similar-looking but unrelated herons, cranes fly with necks outstretched, not pulled back. Most have elaborate and noisy courting displays or "dances".

Grebes

Order: PodicipediformesFamily: Podicipedidae

Grebes are small to medium-large freshwater diving birds. They have lobed toes and are excellent swimmers and divers. However, they have their feet placed far back on the body, making them quite ungainly on land.

Stone-curlews, thick-knees
Order: CharadriiformesFamily: Burhinidae

The thick-knees are a group of waders found worldwide within the tropical zone, with some species also breeding in temperate Europe and Australia. They are medium to large waders with strong black or yellow-black bills, large yellow eyes, and cryptic plumage. Despite being classed as waders, most species have a preference for arid or semi-arid habitats.

Oystercatchers

Order: CharadriiformesFamily: Haematopodidae

The oystercatchers are large and noisy plover-like birds, with strong bills used for smashing or prising open molluscs.

Stilts, avocets
Order: CharadriiformesFamily: Recurvirostridae

Recurvirostridae is a family of large wading birds which includes the avocets and stilts. The avocets have long legs and long up-curved bills. The stilts have extremely long legs and long, thin, straight bills.

Plovers

Order: CharadriiformesFamily: Charadriidae

The family Charadriidae includes the plovers, dotterels, and lapwings. They are small to medium-sized birds with compact bodies, short thick necks, and long, usually pointed, wings. They are found in open country worldwide, mostly in habitats near water.

Sandpipers, snipes

Order: CharadriiformesFamily: Scolopacidae

Scolopacidae is a large diverse family of small to medium-sized shorebirds including the sandpipers, curlews, godwits, shanks, tattlers, woodcocks, snipes, dowitchers, and phalaropes. The majority of these species eat small invertebrates picked out of the mud or soil. Variation in length of legs and bills enables multiple species to feed in the same habitat, particularly on the coast, without direct competition for food.

Coursers, pratincoles
Order: CharadriiformesFamily: Glareolidae

Glareolidae is a family of wading birds comprising the pratincoles, which have short legs, long pointed wings, and long forked tails, and the coursers, which have long legs, short wings, and long, pointed bills which curve downwards.

Gulls, terns, skimmers

Order: CharadriiformesFamily: Laridae

Laridae is a family of medium to large seabirds, the gulls, terns, and skimmers. Gulls are typically grey or white, often with black markings on the head or wings. They have stout, longish bills and webbed feet. Terns are a group of generally medium to large seabirds typically with grey or white plumage, often with black markings on the head. Most terns hunt fish by diving but some pick insects off the surface of fresh water. Terns are generally long-lived birds, with several species known to live in excess of 30 years.

Skuas

Order: CharadriiformesFamily: Stercorariidae

The family Stercorariidae are, in general, medium to large birds, typically with grey or brown plumage, often with white markings on the wings. They nest on the ground in temperate and arctic regions and are long-distance migrants.

Auks

Order: CharadriiformesFamily: Alcidae

Alcids are superficially similar to penguins due to their black-and-white colours, their upright posture, and some of their habits. However, they are not related to the penguins and differ in being able to fly. Auks live on the open sea, only deliberately coming ashore to nest.

Loons

Order: GaviiformesFamily: Gaviidae

Loons, also known as divers, are a group of aquatic birds found in many parts of North America and northern Europe. They are the size of a large duck or small goose, which they somewhat resemble in shape when swimming, but to which they are completely unrelated.

Austral storm petrels
Order: ProcellariiformesFamily: Oceanitidae

The storm petrels are the smallest seabirds, relatives of the petrels, feeding on planktonic crustaceans and small fish picked from the surface, typically while hovering. The flight is fluttering and sometimes bat-like. Until 2018, this family's species were included with the other storm petrels in family Hydrobatidae.

Albatrosses
Order: ProcellariiformesFamily: Diomedeidae

The albatrosses are among the largest of flying birds, and the great albatrosses from the genus Diomedea have the largest wingspans of any extant birds.

Northern storm petrels

Order: ProcellariiformesFamily: Hydrobatidae

Though the members of this family are similar in many respects to the southern storm petrels, including their general appearance and habits, there are enough genetic differences to warrant their placement in a separate family.

Petrels, shearwaters, diving petrels

Order: ProcellariiformesFamily: Procellariidae

The procellariids are the main group of medium-sized "true petrels", characterised by united nostrils with medium septum and a long outer functional primary.

Storks
Order: CiconiiformesFamily: Ciconiidae

Storks are large, long-legged, long-necked, wading birds with long, stout bills. Storks are mute, but bill-clattering is an important mode of communication at the nest. Their nests can be large and may be reused for many years. Many species are migratory.

Frigatebirds
Order: SuliformesFamily: Fregatidae

Frigatebirds are large seabirds usually found over tropical oceans. They are large, black-and-white, or completely black, with long wings and deeply forked tails. The males have coloured inflatable throat pouches. They do not swim or walk and cannot take off from a flat surface. Having the largest wingspan-to-body-weight ratio of any bird, they are essentially aerial, able to stay aloft for more than a week.

Gannets, boobies
Order: SuliformesFamily: Sulidae

The sulids comprise the gannets and boobies. Both groups are medium to large coastal seabirds that plunge-dive for fish.

Cormorants, shags

Order: SuliformesFamily: Phalacrocoracidae

Phalacrocoracidae is a family of medium to large coastal, fish-eating seabirds that includes cormorants and shags. Plumage colouration varies, with the majority having mainly dark plumage, some species being black-and-white and a few being colourful.

Ibises and spoonbills

Order: PelecaniformesFamily: Threskiornithidae

Threskiornithidae is a family of large terrestrial and wading birds which includes the ibises and spoonbills. They have long, broad wings with 11 primary and about 20 secondary feathers. They are strong fliers and despite their size and weight, very capable soarers.

Herons, bitterns

Order: PelecaniformesFamily: Ardeidae

The family Ardeidae contains the bitterns, herons, and egrets. Herons and egrets are medium to large wading birds with long necks and legs. Bitterns tend to be shorter-necked and more wary. Members of Ardeidae fly with their necks retracted, unlike other long-necked birds such as storks, ibises, and spoonbills.

Osprey
Order: AccipitriformesFamily: Pandionidae

The family Pandionidae contains o species, the osprey. Ospreys are medium-large raptors that are specialist fish-eaters.

Kites, hawks, eagles

Order: AccipitriformesFamily: Accipitridae

Accipitridae is a family of birds of prey which includes hawks, eagles, kites, harriers, and Old World vultures. These birds have powerful hooked beaks for tearing flesh from their prey, strong legs, powerful talons, and keen eyesight.

Barn owls
Order: StrigiformesFamily: Tytonidae

Barn owls are medium to large owls with large heads and characteristic heart-shaped faces. They have long strong legs with powerful talons.

Owls

Order: StrigiformesFamily: Strigidae

The typical owls are small to large solitary nocturnal birds of prey. They have large forward-facing eyes and ears, a hawk-like beak, and a conspicuous circle of feathers around each eye called a facial disk.

Hoopoes
Order: BucerotiformesFamily: Upupidae

Hoopoes have black, white, and orangey-pink colouring with a large erectile crest on their head.

Rollers
Order: CoraciiformesFamily: Coraciidae

Rollers resemble crows in size and build, but are more closely related to the kingfishers and bee-eaters. They share the colourful appearance of those groups with blues and browns predominating. The two inner front toes are connected, but the outer toe is not.

Kingfishers

Order: CoraciiformesFamily: Alcedinidae

Kingfishers are medium-sized birds with large heads, long pointed bills, short legs, and stubby tails.

Bee-eaters
Order: CoraciiformesFamily: Meropidae

The bee-eaters are a family of near passerine birds found mostly in Africa, but others occur in southern Europe, Madagascar, Australia, and New Guinea. They are characterised by richly coloured plumage, slender bodies, and usually elongated central tail feathers. All are colourful and have long downturned bills and pointed wings, which give them a swallow-like appearance when seen from afar.

Woodpeckers

Order: PiciformesFamily: Picidae

Woodpeckers are small to medium-sized birds with chisel-like beaks, short legs, stiff tails, and long tongues used for capturing insects. Some species have feet with two toes pointing forward and two backward, while several species have only three toes. Many woodpeckers have the habit of tapping noisily on tree trunks with their beaks. Great spotted woodpecker has started breeding in recent years.

Caracaras, falcons

Order: FalconiformesFamily: Falconidae

Falconidae is a family of diurnal birds of prey. They differ from hawks, eagles, and kites in that they kill with their beaks instead of their talons.

Tyrant flycatchers, calyptura
Order: PasseriformesFamily: Tyrannidae

Tyrant flycatchers occur throughout North and South America. They superficially resemble the Old World flycatchers, but are more robust and have stronger bills. They do not have the sophisticated vocal capabilities of the songbirds. Most, but not all, are rather plain. As the name implies, most are insectivorous.

Shrikes

Order: PasseriformesFamily: Laniidae

Shrikes are passerine birds known for their habit of catching other birds and small animals and impaling the uneaten portions of their bodies on thorns. A shrike's beak is hooked, like that of a typical bird of prey.

Vireos, greenlets, shrike-babblers
Order: PasseriformesFamily: Vireonidae

The vireos are a group of small to medium-sized passerine birds restricted to the New World. They are typically greenish in colour and resemble New World warblers apart from their heavier bills.

Figbirds, orioles, turnagra
Order: PasseriformesFamily: Oriolidae

The Old World orioles are colourful passerine birds. They are not related to the New World orioles.

Crows, jays

Order: PasseriformesFamily: Corvidae

The family Corvidae includes crows, ravens, jackdaws, jays, choughs, magpies, treepies, nutcrackers, and ground jays. Corvids are above average in size among the Passeriformes, and some of the larger species show high levels of intelligence.

Waxwings
Order: PasseriformesFamily: Bombycillidae

The waxwings are a group of birds with soft silky plumage and unique red tips to some of the wing feathers. In the Bohemian and cedar waxwings, these tips look like sealing wax and give the group its name. These are arboreal birds of northern forests. They live on insects in summer and berries in winter.

Tits, chickadees

Order: PasseriformesFamily: Paridae

The Paridae are mainly small stocky woodland species with short stout bills. Some have crests. They are adaptable birds, with a mixed diet including seeds and insects.

Penduline tits
Order: PasseriformesFamily: Remizidae

The penduline-tits are a group of small passerine birds related to the true tits. They are insectivores.

Bearded reedling
Order: PasseriformesFamily: Panuridae

This species, the only one in its family, is found in reed beds throughout temperate Europe and Asia.

Larks

Order: PasseriformesFamily: Alaudidae

Larks are small terrestrial birds with often extravagant songs and display flights. Most larks are fairly dull in appearance. Their food is insects and seeds.

Swallows, martins

Order: PasseriformesFamily: Hirundinidae

The family Hirundinidae is adapted to aerial feeding. They have a slender streamlined body, long pointed wings, and a short bill with a wide gape. The feet are adapted to perching rather than walking, and the front toes are partially joined at the base.

Streaked scrub warbler
Order: PasseriformesFamily: Scotocercidae

The members of this family are found throughout Africa, Asia, and Polynesia. This species is the only one found regularly in Europe.

Bushtits

Order: PasseriformesFamily: Aegithalidae

Long-tailed tits are a group of small passerine birds with medium to long tails. They make woven bag nests in trees. Most eat a mixed diet which includes insects.

Leaf warblers and allies
Order: PasseriformesFamily: Phylloscopidae

Leaf warblers are a family of small insectivorous birds found mostly in Eurasia and ranging into Wallacea and Africa. The species are of various sizes, often green-plumaged above and yellow below, or more subdued with greyish-green to greyish-brown colors.

Reed warblers and allies
Order: PasseriformesFamily: Acrocephalidae

The members of this family are usually rather large for "warblers". Most are rather plain olivaceous brown above with much yellow to beige below. They are usually found in open woodland, reedbeds, or tall grass. The family occurs mostly in southern to western Eurasia and surroundings, but it also ranges far into the Pacific, with some species in Africa.

Grassbirds and allies
Order: PasseriformesFamily: Locustellidae

Locustellidae are a family of small insectivorous songbirds found mainly in Eurasia, Africa, and the Australian region. They are smallish birds with tails that are usually long and pointed, and tend to be drab brownish or buffy all over.

Cisticolas and allies
Order: PasseriformesFamily: Cisticolidae

The Cisticolidae are warblers found mainly in warmer southern regions of the Old World. They are generally very small birds of drab brown or grey appearance found in open country such as grassland or scrub.

Sylviid babblers

Order: PasseriformesFamily: Sylviidae

The family Sylviidae is a group of small insectivorous passerine birds. They mainly occur as breeding species, as another common name (Old World warblers) implies, in Europe, Asia, and, to a lesser extent, Africa. Most are of generally undistinguished appearance, but many have distinctive songs.

Goldcrests, kinglets

Order: PasseriformesFamily: Regulidae

The kinglets, also called crests, are a small group of birds which were sometimes included in the Old World warblers, family Sylviidae.

Wrens

Order: PasseriformesFamily: Troglodytidae

The wrens are mainly small and inconspicuous except for their loud songs. These birds have short wings and thin down-turned bills. Several species often hold their tails upright. All are insectivorous.

Treecreepers

Order: PasseriformesFamily: Certhiidae

Treecreepers are small woodland birds, brown above and white below. They have thin pointed down-curved bills, which they use to extricate insects from bark. They have stiff tail feathers, like woodpeckers, which they use to support themselves on vertical trees.

Mockingbirds, thrashers
Order: PasseriformesFamily: Mimidae

The mimids are a family of passerine birds that includes thrashers, mockingbirds, tremblers, and the New World catbirds. These birds are notable for their vocalizations, especially their ability to mimic a wide variety of birds and other sounds heard outdoors. Their colouring tends towards dull-greys and browns.

Starlings, rhabdornis

Order: PasseriformesFamily: Sturnidae

Starlings are small to medium-sized passerine birds. Their flight is strong and direct and they are very gregarious. Their preferred habitat is fairly open country. They eat insects and fruit. Plumage is typically dark with a metallic sheen.

Thrushes

Order: PasseriformesFamily: Turdidae

The thrushes are a group of passerine birds that occur mainly in the Old World. They are plump, soft plumaged, small to medium-sized insectivores or sometimes omnivores, often feeding on the ground. Many have attractive songs.

Chats, Old World flycatchers

Order: PasseriformesFamily: Muscicapidae

Old World flycatchers are a large family of mainly small arboreal insectivores. The appearance of these birds is highly varied, but they mostly have weak songs and harsh calls.

Dippers

Order: PasseriformesFamily: Cinclidae

Dippers are a group of perching birds whose habitat includes aquatic environments in the Americas, Europe, and Asia. They are named for their bobbing or dipping movements.

Old World sparrows, snowfinches

Order: PasseriformesFamily: Passeridae

Sparrows are small passerine birds. In general, sparrows tend to be small, plump, brown or grey birds with short tails and short powerful beaks. Sparrows are seed eaters, but they also consume small insects.

Accentors

Order: PasseriformesFamily: Prunellidae

The accentors are the only bird family which is completely endemic to the Palearctic. They are small, fairly drab species superficially similar to Old World sparrows.

Wagtails, pipits

Order: PasseriformesFamily: Motacillidae

Motacillidae is a family of small passerine birds with medium to long tails. They include the wagtails, longclaws and pipits. They are slender, ground feeding insectivores of open country.

Two subspecies of white wagtail occur in Ireland:
 Motacilla alba yarrelli, "pied wagtail", a common breeding resident.
 M. a. alba, nominate subspecies occurring as a migrant.

Finches, euphonias

Order: PasseriformesFamily: Fringillidae

Finches are seed-eating passerine birds that are small to moderately large and have a strong beak, usually conical and in some species very large. All have twelve tail feathers and nine primaries. These birds have a bouncing flight with alternating bouts of flapping and gliding on closed wings, and most sing well.

Longspurs, snow buntings
Order: PasseriformesFamily: Calcariidae

The Calcariidae are a group of passerine birds that had been traditionally grouped with the New World sparrows, but differ in a number of respects and are usually found in open grassy areas.

Buntings

Order: PasseriformesFamily: Emberizidae

Emberizidae is a family of passerine birds containing a single genus. Until 2017, the New World sparrows (Passerellidae) were also considered part of this family.

New World sparrows
Order: PasseriformesFamily: Passerellidae

Until 2017, these species were considered part of the family Emberizidae. Most of the species are known as sparrows, but these birds are not closely related to the Old World sparrows which are in the family Passeridae. Many of these have distinctive head patterns.

Oropendolas, orioles, blackbirds
Order: PasseriformesFamily: Icteridae

The icterids are a group of small to medium-sized, often colourful, passerine birds restricted to the New World and include the grackles, New World blackbirds, and New World orioles. Most species have black as the predominant plumage colour, often enlivened by yellow, orange, or red.

New World warblers

Order: PasseriformesFamily: Parulidae

The New World warblers are a group of small, often colourful, passerine birds restricted to the New World. Most are arboreal, but some are terrestrial. Most members of this family are insectivores.

Cardinals and allies
Order: PasseriformesFamily: Cardinalidae

The cardinals are a family of robust, seed-eating birds with strong bills. They are typically associated with open woodland. The sexes usually have distinct plumages.

Notes

References

 Dempsey, Eric & O'Clery, Michael (1995). Pocket Guide to the Common Birds of Ireland. Gill & Macmillan Ltd, Dublin.
 Dempsey, Eric & O'Clery, Michael (2007). Finding Birds in Ireland: The Complete Guide. Gill & Macmillan Ltd, Dublin.

See also
List of birds
Lists of birds by region

External links

National Biodiversity Network  Distribution Maps (Ongoing)
Oiseaux Ireland page. Many photos. Not all species.
Irish Birding Latest sightings.
Irish Rare Birds Committee
NIBWA Northern Ireland Bird watchers Association.
NIOC Northern Ireland Ornithologists Club. Excellent photographs
Bird Guides Irish list, county lists, latest sightings and photos.
RSPB Royal Society for the Protection of Birds A-Z 

Ireland
Birds
Ireland
Birds